The Sanjak of Drama (Ottoman Turkish: Sancak-i/Liva-i Drama) was a second-level Ottoman province (sanjak or liva) encompassing the region around the town of Drama (now in Greece) in eastern Macedonia.

The sanjak was formed as part of the Tanzimat reforms ca. 1846, from territory taken from various provinces; Drama itself belonged to the Sanjak of Siroz. The sanjak belonged to the Salonica Eyalet, after 1867 the Salonica Vilayet. In 1867–69, the Sanjak of Drama was merged back into the Sanjak of Siroz, was re-established and then temporarily abolished in 1872–73. In 1891, its territories east of the Nestos river became part of the Sanjak of Adrianople.

In 1912, the sanjak comprised six sub-provinces (kazas): Drama, Kavala, Sarışaban (Chrysoupoli), the island of Taşuz (Thasos) and Pravişte (Eleftheroupolis). The province was dissolved when occupied by Bulgarian troops in the First Balkan War, and in 1913, after the Second Balkan War, it became part of Greece

Sources
 

Macedonia under the Ottoman Empire
Drama
Drama
History of Drama, Greece
States and territories established in the 1840s
States and territories disestablished in 1912
Salonica vilayet
1840s establishments in the Ottoman Empire
1912 disestablishments in the Ottoman Empire